George Garrard  (31 May 1760 – 8 October 1826) was an English animal, landscape and portrait painter, modeller, sculptor, engraver and printmaker. He played a major role in lobbying Parliament to introduce legislation to protect the copyright of works by modellers of animal and human figures.

Life and work

Garrard came from a family of artists, tracing his descent back to Marcus Gheeraerts the Younger (c. 1561/62–1636) who was a painter to Queen Elizabeth I of England and her successor Anne of Denmark. He studied art first under a well-known drawing-master called Joseph Simpson, then with Sawrey Gilpin, and in 1778 became a student of the Royal Academy, where, in 1781, he first exhibited some pictures of horses and dogs. Three years later he sent with other pictures a "View of a Brewhouse Yard", which attracted the notice of Sir Joshua Reynolds, who commissioned him to paint a similar picture. In 1793 he exhibited "Sheep-shearing at Aston Clinton, Buckinghamshire", but early in 1795 it occurred to him that (plaster) models of cattle might be useful to landscape painters, and from this time he combined painting with modelling.
 
This led Garrard in 1797, with the concurrence of the Royal Academy and some of the leading sculptors of the day, to petition parliament in support of a bill for securing copyright on the works of modellers of human and animal figures. This resulted in an act of 1798 - "An Act for encouraging the Art of making new Models and Casts of Busts, and other Things therein mentioned" ("The Models and Busts act"). Now, for the first time, British copyright law provided protection for a medium other than print.

In 1800 Garrard was elected an associate of the Royal Academy, and in the same year he published a folio volume with coloured plates, "A Description of the different varieties of Oxen common in the British Isles. In 1802 he exhibited "A Peasant attacked by Wolves in the Snow" but after 1804 he appears to have restricted himself almost entirely to sculpture and modelling.

Garrard painted both in oil and watercolours, and contributed also to the annual exhibitions of the Royal Academy busts, medallions, bas-reliefs, and groups of animals, such as "Fighting Bulls" and "An Elk pursued by Wolves", sometimes in marble or bronze, but more often in plaster. He exhibited in all 215 works at the Royal Academy, besides a few others at the British Institution and the Society of British Artists. He painted a large picture called "Woburn Sheep-shearing in 1804" and containing eighty-eight portraits of agricultural celebrities of the time (it was hung at one time in Woburn Abbey). The picture was engraved in aquatint by the artist himself.

He died at Queen's Buildings, Brompton, London, on the morning of Sunday 8 October 1826, while kneeling to pray in a church alongside his family. A chronological list of his paintings can be found in Walter Gilbey's Animal Painters, volume 1 (see "further reading").

Family

Garrard married Matilda Gilpin, the eldest daughter of his mentor Sawrey Gilpin.

Sculptural Works

Bust of Benjamin West (1803) exhibited at RA
Bust of Henry Holland (1803) at Woburn Abbey
Bust of Thomas Adkin (1803) at Southill, Bedfordshire
Bust of Sir Joseph Banks (1804) at Burghley House
Bust of Henry Holland (1806) at Southill, Bedfordshire
Bust of Sawrey Gilpin (1806) at Burghley House
Bust of the Earl of Egremont (1807) at Petworth
Bust of Charles James Fox (1807) at Uppark
Terracotta bust of Pitt (1808) in the Fitzwilliam Museum
Bust of Humphrey Repton (1810) exhibited at RA
Bust of William Wilberforce (1810) exhibited at RA
Bust of Richard Brinsley Sheridan (1813) in the Soane Museum

References

Attribution

Further reading
Gilbey, Sir Walter. Animal painters of England from the year 1650, volume 1 (London: Vinton & Co., 1900) pp. 176–189.

External links

 
George Garrard online (ArtCyclopedia)
George Garrard, Artnet
 Profile, Royal Academy of Arts Collections
Paintings by G. Garrard  (Bridgeman Art Library)
Portraits published by George Garrard (National Portrait Gallery, London)
Loading the Drays at Whitbread Brewery, Chiswell Street, London, 1783 
Portraits by George Garrard (Leeds Art Gallery - 30 August 2010)

18th-century English painters
English male painters
19th-century English painters
English watercolourists
English illustrators
English sculptors
English male sculptors
English engravers
English printmakers
Equine artists
Landscape artists
English portrait painters
British lobbyists
1760 births
1826 deaths
19th-century British sculptors
Associates of the Royal Academy
19th-century English male artists
18th-century English male artists